This is a summary of 1959 in music in the United Kingdom, including the official charts from that year.

Events
January – Ealing Jazz Club opens in London.
21 April – Ballerina Margot Fonteyn is jailed for 24 hours in Panama on suspicion of planning a coup against the government of president Ernesto de la Guardia.
1 June – The first edition of Juke Box Jury, presented by David Jacobs, is broadcast on BBC television.  The first panel consists of Pete Murray, Alma Cogan, Gary Miller and Susan Stranks.
10 June – On the opening day of a 'Pageant of Magna Carta', Benjamin Britten's Fanfare for St Edmundsbury is given its first performance in the precincts of St Edmundsbury Cathedral.
30 October – Ronnie Scott's Jazz Club opens in the Soho district of London.

Charts

The Official UK Singles Chart
See List of UK Singles Chart number ones of the 1950s

Classical music: new works
William Alwyn – Symphony No. 4
Malcolm Arnold – Sweeney Todd (ballet)
Arthur Bliss – Birthday Song for a Royal Child (composed to celebrate the birth of Prince Andrew
Benjamin Britten – Missa Brevis
Iain Hamilton – Sinfonia, for two orchestras
Francis Jackson – Diversion for Mixtures
Elizabeth Maconchy – "A Hymn to God the Father", for tenor and piano
Thea Musgrave – Scottish Dance Suite, for orchestra
Grace Williams – All Seasons Shall Be Sweet

Film and Incidental music
William Alwyn – Killers of Kilimanjaro, starring Anthony Newley
Richard Rodney Bennett – The Man Who Could Cheat Death directed by Terence Fisher, starring Anton Diffring.
James Bernard – The Hound of the Baskervilles directed by Terence Fisher, starring Peter Cushing.
Stanley Black – Violent Moment, starring Lyndon Brook
Laurie Johnson
No Trees in the Street, starring Sylvia Syms
Tiger Bay, starring John Mills and Hayley Mills

Musical theatre
Wolf Mankowitz, David Heneker and Monty Norman – Make Me an Offer
Sandy Wilson – Pieces of Eight

Musical films
Expresso Bongo, starring Laurence Harvey and Cliff Richard
Follow a Star, starring Norman Wisdom and June Laverick
The Lady Is a Square, starring Anna Neagle and Frankie Vaughan
Tommy the Toreador, starring Tommy Steele

Births
14 January – Chas Smash (Madness)
15 January – Pete Trewavas, bass player and songwriter
28 January – Dave Sharp (The Alarm)
3 February – Lol Tolhurst, drummer (The Cure, Presence, Easy Cure, and Levinhurst)
25 February – Mike Peters, singer/songwriter (The Alarm)
17 March – Mike Lindup, singer/keyboard player (Level 42)
10 April – Brian Setzer, singer/guitarist (The Stray Cats)
21 April – Robert Smith, singer (The Cure)
27 April – Sheena Easton, singer
22 May – Morrissey, singer (The Smiths, solo)
28 May – Steve Strange, singer (died 2015)
29 May - Mel Gaynor, drummer (Simple Minds)
5 June –  Robert Lloyd, English singer
19 June - Dennis Fuller, Jamaican-born singer (London Boys) (d. 1996)
24 June – Andy McCluskey (Orchestral Manoeuvres in the Dark)
28 June – Clint Boon, singer and keyboard player (Inspiral Carpets and The Clint Boon Experience)
30 June – Brendan Perry, singer-songwriter, guitarist, and producer (Dead Can Dance and The Scavengers)
1 July - Edem Ephraim, singer (London Boys) (d. 1996)
9 July – Jim Kerr, singer (Simple Minds)
5 August – Pete Burns, singer (Dead or Alive) (d. 2016)
29 August – Eddi Reader, singer
24 September – Drummie Zeb, singer (Aswad) (d. 2022)
4 October – Chris Lowe, keyboard player (Pet Shop Boys)
10 October – Kirsty MacColl, singer/songwriter (d. 2000)
7 November – Richard Barrett, composer
27 November – Charlie Burchill, guitarist (Simple Minds)
1 December – Billy Childish, artist and musician
30 December – Tracey Ullman, actress and singer

Deaths
11 March – Haydn Wood, violinist and composer (born 1882)
25 March – Billy Mayerl, pianist and composer (born 1902)
9 June – Sonnie Hale, actor and singer (born 1902)
6 September – Kay Kendall, musical comedy actress (born 1926) (leukaemia)
11 September – Ann Drummond-Grant, operatic contralto (born 1905)
21 September – Agnes Nicholls, operatic soprano (born 1877)
28 September – Gerard Hoffnung, German-born artist, musician and humorist (born 1925) (cerebral haemorrhage)
19 October – Stanley Bate, pianist and composer (born 1911) (suicide)
26 November – Albert Ketèlbey, pianist, conductor and composer (born 1875)
29 December – Robin Milford, composer (born 1903)
30 December – G. W. Briggs, hymn-writer (born 1875)

See also
 1959 in British television
 1959 in the United Kingdom
 List of British films of 1959

References

 
British Music, 1959 In
British music by year